Iain James Stewart Black (born 1967 in Winnipeg, Manitoba) is a former politician in British Columbia, Canada. He was first elected to represent the riding of Port Moody-Westwood in the Legislative Assembly of British Columbia in the BC general election held on May 17, 2005, as a member of the BC Liberal Party. He was re-elected in the 2009 BC general election in the Port Moody-Coquitlam riding.

Black was the Minister of Labour between October 25, 2010 and March 23, 2011. He was previously appointed Minister of Labour and Citizens' Services on June 23, 2008 and Minister of Small Business, Technology and Economic Development on June 10, 2009.

Black resigned as a Member of the Legislative Assembly, effective October 3, 2011, to accept a job as the president and CEO of the Vancouver Board of Trade.

Black joined Maximizer Software Inc as President and CEO in 2019.

Election results (partial)

References

External links
Official Biography from the website of the Legislative Assembly of British Columbia
MLA Web Site of Iain Black

1967 births
Living people
Members of the Executive Council of British Columbia
British Columbia Liberal Party MLAs
People from Coquitlam
Politicians from Winnipeg
21st-century Canadian politicians